Koshcheyevo is a rural locality (a selo) and the administrative center of Koshcheyevskoye Rural Settlement, Korochansky District, Belgorod Oblast, Russia. The population was 894 as of 2010. There are 8 streets.

Geography 
Koshcheyevo is located 14 km northwest of Korocha (the district's administrative centre) by road. Yemelyanovka is the nearest rural locality.

References 

Rural localities in Korochansky District